MaWayy is an American-Iranian music duo from Los Angeles, United States and Bandar-e Anzali, Iran consisting of producers and DJs Brian Wayy and Masoud Fuladi.[2] They are known for their Billboard charting songs "Wrong" and "Blame" and hosting "MaWayy radio" show on Digitally Imported Radio. In 2020, MaWayy signed their song "Calling Her My Name" to Sony Music Norway and became India Viral 50 Spotify charts, radio stations top 40 such as N-JOY and Laluna

Charts

References

External links
 

Musical groups from Los Angeles
Electronic dance music duos
Musical groups established in 2015
2015 establishments in California